Nahal Paran is a seasonal stream in Egypt's Sinai Peninsula and Israel's Negev Desert. With a length of 150 kilometers, it is the third largest watercourse in Israel after the Jordan River and Yarmouk River. It is also the widest watercourse in Israel.

The association of the name "Paran Stream" with this specific wadi is a modern one. Israeli authorities have introduced the name "Paran Stream" by adopting it from the Paran Desert mentioned in the Hebrew Bible. However, the modern identification of the biblical Paran Desert with a specific part of the Sinai Peninsula might or might not be accurate.

Hydrology
The origin of the river is in the Paran Desert of the Sinai Peninsula, and it flows into the estuary of Nahal HaArava. Water flow exists only during flash floods.  This is the drainage basin's largest river, with an area of thousands of square kilometers, creating broad planes that separate the Negev's high north and the Eilat mountains of the south.

In the past, during floods, like other major rivers in the Negev, Nahal paran would flood the Arava Road (the main road to Eilat), until the construction of a bridge over the river. The stream had the highest recorded flow in Israel of 1,150 cubic meters per second on 6 November 1970. In 2014, the record was broken by a flow of 1,280 cubic meters per second measured at Zin. For comparison, the average flow in the Jordan River is 16 cubic meters per second.

Ground water near the riverbed provides drinking water for communities in the Arava desert. This water has high salinity and undergoes desalination.

References

Rivers of Israel